Prudence Carter is an American sociologist.  She is a Sarah and Joseph Jr. Dowling Professor of Sociology at Brown University. She has been elected president of the American Sociological Association with effect from 2023.

Carter previously served as dean of the Graduate School of Education at University of California, Berkeley, where she was awarded The Berkeley Citation in 2021. She is a fellow of the American Educational Research Association, an elected member of the National Academy of Education, and is currently Sarah and Joseph, Jr. Dowling Professor of Sociology at Brown University.

Education 
Carter has a bachelor's degree in economics and applied mathematics from Brown University, an MA in education and sociology from Teachers College, Columbia University, and an MPhil and PhD in sociology from Columbia University.

Career 
Carter was an assistant professor in the department of sociology at Harvard University. She served on the faculty at Stanford University from 2007 to 2016. Carter also served as the Faculty Director of John W. Gardner Center for Youth and Their Communities, and the Director of the Research Institute for Comparative Studies in Race and Ethnicity. From 2016 to 2021, she was Dean of the Graduate School of Education and E.H. and Mary E. Pardee Professor at the University of California at Berkeley. Before stepping down as the UC Berkeley GSE dean on July 31, 2021, she was awarded The Berkeley Citation.

Books 
 Keepin’ It Real: School Success beyond Black and White (2005) Oxford University Press 
 Stubborn Roots: Race, Culture, and Inequality in U.S. & South African Schools (2012) Oxford University Press 
 Co-editor with Kevin G. Welner of Closing the Opportunity Gap: What America Must Do to Give Every Child an Even Chance (2013) Oxford University Press

References

External links 

Year of birth missing (living people)
Living people
American women sociologists
American sociologists
Academics from Mississippi
Brown University alumni
Teachers College, Columbia University alumni
Harvard University faculty
Stanford University faculty
University of California, Berkeley faculty
Brown University faculty
21st-century American women